Paul E. Jacobs (born October 30, 1962) is an American businessman and the former executive chairman of Qualcomm.

Family and education

Jacobs was born to a Jewish family, the son of Joan (née Klein) and Irwin M. Jacobs. His father was co-founder of Linkabit and Qualcomm. He has three brothers: Gary E. Jacobs (born 1958), Hal Jacobs (born 1960), and Jeffrey A. Jacobs (born 1966). His niece Sara Jacobs represent's California's 53rd congressional district in the U.S. House of Representatives.

He earned a bachelor's in Engineering and Computer Science in 1984, an MS degree in Electrical Engineering in 1986, and a PhD degree in Electrical Engineering and Computer Science in 1989 from the University of California, Berkeley.

Career
Jacobs has been executive chairman of Qualcomm since March 2009. He had been the chief executive officer (CEO) from July 2005 to March 2014, and previous to that date was the president of Qualcomm Wireless and Internet Group from July 2001. Jacobs started with the company as an engineer in the wireless technology development group in 1990.

In December 2013, Qualcomm announced that Jacobs would step down as CEO and be replaced by president and COO Steve Mollenkopf from March 2014.

On May 28, 2013, Jacobs along with his three brothers became minority owners in the Sacramento Kings in a partnership with Vivek Ranadivé and Mark Mastrov. The NBA approved the sale on May 28. In 2015, Jacobs aided in the funding of Heal, a company that created a mobile app to allow for physician house calls at the press of a button.

In 2016, Jacobs was elected a member of the National Academy of Engineering for leadership in the design, development, and worldwide commercialization of wireless products and services.

In March 2018 Qualcomm announced that Jacobs would be stepping down as the company's executive chairman. On March 16, 2018, Qualcomm removed Jacobs from its board, after he "broached a long-shot bid" for a buyout earlier that week. The company also announced that Jacobs would not be re-nominated to its board of directors at the March 23 annual stockholder meeting. “The board reached that decision following his notification to the Board that he has decided to explore the possibility of making a proposal to acquire Qualcomm,” the company said, adding that its board will consist of 10 directors at the meeting.

Awards and recognition
In 2015 he received the Distinguished Industry Leader Award, and in 2014 received the IEEE Ernst Weber Managerial Leadership Award. His other awards include:

 2007–2014 Institutional Investor, List of America's Best (Telecom Sector) - Best CEO
 2008 Berkeley Engineering Innovation Award
 2008 Radio Club of America, The Sarnoff Citation
 2009 IEEE CASS Industrial Pioneer Award
 2010 Higginbotham Corporate Leadership Award
 2011 Laptop Magazine, 25 Most Influential People in Mobile
 2011 NCAFP Global Business Leadership Award
 2011–2012 Global Telecoms Business, Power 100
 2012 VentureBeat, Top Ten Mobile Movers
 2012 FORTUNE, Ten Brilliant Technology Visionaries
 2012 Samsung Award of Honor
 2013 Sesame Workshop, Corporate Leadership Award
 2013 Edison Achievement Award
 2014 GSMA Chairman's Award
 2016 National Academy of Engineering

Personal life
In 1993, Jacobs married Stacey Jacobs; they had three children. The couple divorced in 2013. In 2016, he married French-Canadian Geneviève Tremblay; they have two daughters together.

References

External links

Paul E. Jacobs - Business Week

1962 births
Living people
American technology chief executives
UC Berkeley College of Engineering alumni
Qualcomm people
Jewish American sportspeople
Jacobs family (telecom)
21st-century American Jews